The Southern Pacific was an American railroad.

Southern Pacific may also refer to:

Southern Pacific (band)
Southern Pacific Ocean